Two Tigers is a multidirectional shooter created by Bally Midway and released in arcades in 1984. It is themed around World War II-era planes attempting to sink naval ships, but there are no references as to which countries are involved in the conflict. Two Tigers offers the choice of two separate modes: one or two players working together to sink the same ships or a dogfight mode where two players attempt to down each other's plane.

The game was released as both a standalone cabinet and as a conversion kit for Tron. The two have different controllers and also differ in many gameplay and presentation details.

Gameplay
In the primary mode, each player steers an always moving plane by rotating it clockwise and counter-clockwise. Enemy planes fly horizontally across the screen; shooting them causes them to crash into the ocean or the large ship floating in it. Each hit from a downed plane destroys a piece of the ship where it crashes. Naval mines drifting in the water can be shot, damaging the ship from below. Players can damage the ship directly by dropping bombs. Only one bomb per player can be in the air at once.

Destroying an entire vertical column of a ship causes a leak. When enough leaks have been created (based on the level), the ship explodes. As an intermission, submarines, sharks, and swimmers occupy the open water and can be shot. After a brief respite, a new ship arrives.

Lives are unlimited in Two Tigers. Flying into another plane spawns a replacement once the wreckage falls offscreen. Player-controlled planes do not collide with the ship at the bottom. After a certain amount of time an undestroyed ship leaves; three such departures ends the game.

Release
There are two variations of Two Tigers machines. The original, standalone version has a flight yoke to steer the plane. Ambient audio is provided by an 8-track tape player in the cabinet. The game was later released as a conversion kit for Midway's Tron which uses the weighted spinner to rotate the plane and does not include the 8-track player. It has significant differences in terms of gameplay, visuals, and audio compared to the original.

References

External link
Two Tigers at Arcade History

1984 video games
Arcade video games
Arcade-only video games
Midway video games
Shoot 'em ups
Video games developed in the United States